The 1982 Grote Prijs Jef Scherens was the 18th edition of the Grote Prijs Jef Scherens cycle race and was held on 19 September 1982. The race started and finished in Leuven. The race was won by Rudy Matthijs.

General classification

References

1982
1982 in road cycling
1982 in Belgian sport